Slow Me Down is the seventh studio album by American country music artist Sara Evans, released in 2014 by RCA Nashville.

Content
Evans co-wrote three of the album's eleven tracks and co-produced the record with Mark Bright, whom she previously worked with on 2005's Real Fine Place. The album includes a cover of Gavin DeGraw's "Not Over You," with him providing harmony vocals, and a duet with Isaac Slade of The Fray on "Can't Stop Loving You." Vince Gill, who last collaborated with Evans on her 1998 No. 1 hit "No Place That Far," sings harmony vocals on "Better Off." "Revival" was previously recorded under the title "A Little Revival" by one of its co-writers, Radney Foster ("A Real Fine Place to Start"), on his 2009 album, Revival.

The album's title track, "Slow Me Down," was released as the album's lead-off single on September 23, 2013. It debuted at #57 on the U.S. Billboard Country Airplay chart for the week of September 14, 2013, and ultimately reached a peak of number 17 in April 2014.

The second single was announced to be "Can't Stop Loving You" with a release date of July 21, 2014. For unknown reasons however, the release was pushed back to August 25, 2014 and then later cancelled completely with "Put My Heart Down" announced as the next single instead. "Put My Heart Down" was released on September 29, 2014. It debuted at number 60 on the U.S. Billboard Country Airplay chart for the week of November 8, 2014, and ultimately reached a peak of number 57, only spending four weeks on the chart. Evans appeared on ABC's Nashville to perform a duet version of "Put My Heart Down" with Will Chase (who plays Luke Wheeler on the show) on October 29, 2014.

Critical reception

Slow Me Down garnered acclaim from music critics. At Metacritic, the album has a Metascore of 87, indicating "universal acclaim". Erik Ernst of the Milwaukee Journal Sentinel gave a positive review, saying that the album "is a mostly joyful affair that finds the singer even more confident as she explores the many sides of love" on which "She's been there and has come out singing better than ever on the other side." At The Boston Globe, Sarah Rodman gave a positive review, stating that the release is better than her predecessor, and she says "the tracks that stand out have a fresh appeal." Jon Caramanica of The New York Times gave a positive review, and writes that Evans "robust and sweet voice" are what sets the album apart because "She sings with power, grace and dignity.". At USA Today, Brian Mansfield rated the album three out of four stars, stating that "In songs spanning soaring pop and stone country, Evans recounts all the ways to walk away, though she'd rather be convinced to stay", and the likes of "Gavin DeGraw, Vince Gill and Isaac Slade beckon her back." Stephen Thomas Erlewine of AllMusic rated the album four stars out of five, writing that "fans hoping that Evans will return to country music will be disappointed, but Slow Me Down is something that is rare in 2014: an unapologetic, big-scale adult pop album, constructed with grace and care." At The Oakland Press, Gary Graff rated the album three stars out of four, saying that Evans is "in fine voice and solid country-pop crossover form" on which "Evans isn’t about to be slowed down any time soon." Chuck Dauphin of Billboard rated the album a 91-out-of-100, stating that the album is spectacular making it hard to select a few highlight tracks. At Country Weekly, Tammy Ragusa graded the album an A, writing that "she has found what works best for her on the contemporary side and front-loads the project with those songs." At Got Country Online, Donna Block rated the album a perfect five stars, and according to her "Every single beat is felt, head to toe. It’s quite a feat to balance ever-changing feelings in a song, let alone throughout an album", and it shows just how Evans "maintains a vocal equilibrium from song to song" on the release. Dan MacIntosh of Roughstock rated the album three stars out of five, writing that Evans plays around with many styles on the album, but advises her "a beautiful, natural singing voice is a terrible thing to waste."

Commercial performance
Slow Me Down debuted at number nine on the U.S. Billboard 200, and at number two on the U.S. Billboard Top Country Albums chart selling 27,000 copies in its first week of release.  The album has sold 87,000 copies in the US as of August 2014.

Track listing

Personnel 
 Sara Evans – lead vocals, backing vocals
 Jimmy Nichols – keyboards, accordion
 Charlie Judge – synthesizers
 Kenny Greenberg – electric guitars 
 Jerry McPherson – electric guitars
 Ilya Toshinsky – acoustic guitars, banjo, dobro
 Aubrey Haynie – fiddle, mandolin
 Jimmie Lee Sloas – bass
 Chris McHugh – drums
 Greg Morrow – drums
 Eric Darken – percussion
 Shane Stevens – whistle
 Bob Bailey – backing vocals
 Perry Coleman – backing vocals
 Vicki Hampton – backing vocals
 Jenifer Wrinkle – backing vocals 
 Gavin Degraw – lead vocals on "Not Over You"
 Isaac Slade – lead vocals on "Can't Stop Loving You"
 Vince Gill – harmony vocals on "Better Off"

Production 
 Mark Bright – producer 
 Sara Evans – producer 
 Derek Bason – recording, digital editing 
 Ben Fowler – recording, mixing, digital editing 
 Todd Tidwell – recording 
 Chris Ashburn – recording assistant 
 Chris Small – recording assistant 
 Matt Rausch – additional recording
 Trey Keller – digital editing 
 Brian David Willis – digital editing 
 Adam Ayan – mastering 
 Mike "Frog" Griffith – production coordinator 
 Kristin Wines – production assistant 
 Robert Ascroft – photography 
 Kaelin Evans – hair, make-up, styling
 Alex Stone – glam assistant 
 The Collective Nashville – management

Studios
 Recorded at Blackbird Studio and Starstruck Studios (Nashville, Tennessee).
 Additional recording at The House (Nashville, Tennessee).
 Mixed at Hillywood Studios (Nashville, Tennessee).
 Mastered at Gateway Mastering (Portland, Maine).

Chart performance

Weekly charts

Year-end charts

Singles

References

2014 albums
Sara Evans albums
RCA Records albums
Albums produced by Mark Bright (record producer)